Cole Middle School and Cole Junior High School may refer to:

 Gifford C. Cole Middle School, Eastside Union School District, Lancaster, California
 Cole Middle School, DSST Public Schools, Denver, Colorado
 Archie R. Cole Middle School, East Greenwich School Department, East Greenwich, Connecticut
 Lewis F. Cole Middle School, Fort Lee School District, Fort Lee, New Jersey
 Robert G. Cole Junior-Senior High School, Fort Sam Houston Independent School District, San Antonio, Texas